Noor ul Ain is a Pakistani romantic drama serial started airing on ARY Digital from 10 February 2018. It is produced by Abdullah Seja and directed by Sarmad Khoosat. It stars Imran Abbas and Sajal Aly in the leading roles. The drama was first aired 10 February on ARY Digital on every Saturday, then moved to Tuesday time slot at 9:00 P.M.

Plot
Story of Noor ul Ain (Sajal Aly) and Khizer (Imran Abbas) that how their first accidental meet change their lives completely and how they fall in love with each other. 
They elope thinking they can make it work but to no avail, resulting in serious consequences.

Cast

 Sajal Ali as Noor ul Ain
 Imran Abbas as Khizar Hayat
 Iffat Rahim as Ghazala
 Marina Khan as Khizar’s mother
 Irfan Khoosat as Qasim; Noor and Sofi's father
 Maryam Noor as Sofiya "Sofi"
 Tahira Imam as Tanvir Fatima; Noor & Sofi's mother
 Ammad Hassan Mir as Nauman

Soundtrack

Music is composed by Saad Sultan and OST is sung by acclaimed singers Zeb Bangash and Ali Sethi. According to Gulf News, Zeb Bangash got an old melody project for this OST

Broadcast 
The show is available on MX Player app and in 2018, it was also aired on ARY Digital's sister channel ARY Zindagi.

Awards and nominations

References

External links
 Official website
 
 Noor ul Ain on MX Player

2018 Pakistani television series debuts
Pakistani drama television series
ARY Digital original programming
Urdu-language telenovelas
2018 Pakistani television series endings
Television series set in Punjab, Pakistan
Television shows set in Lahore